The Guizhou WZ-7 Soaring Dragon is a high-altitude long endurance unmanned aerial vehicle (UAV) from the People's Republic of China. The design uses a unique joined-wing design.

The primary mission is expected to be aerial reconnaissance, but it may also be fitted to provide targeting data for anti-ship ballistic missiles and cruise missiles.

Development
The WZ-7 was designed by the Chengdu Aircraft Industry Group and constructed by the Guizhou Aircraft Industry Corporation. A model appeared at the 2006 China International Aviation & Aerospace Exhibition. The first flight has not occurred as of 2011. The drone conducted radar cross-section testing. The WZ-7 entered serial production in 2015 to 2016. A complete redesign of WZ-7 was observed in 2020 with the Chinese Air Force roundel. The redesign featured V-tails, a different engine nozzle with the WS-13 turbofan engine, and changes to the ventral fin and the sail structure. The WZ-7 UAV was officially unveiled by the military at the Zhuhai Airshow in 2021. It was displayed again in 2022.

Design
Larger than most UAVs, the WZ-7 features a tandem, joined-wing design, which allows for a more rigid, less flexible wing than other configurations, with benefits said to include an increased lift-to-drag ratio and less complex flight controls than a HALE UAV with a conventional wing would require. The air intake for the engine is mounted atop the fuselage, with the engine itself mounted in the rear of the aircraft. The prototype aircraft is powered by a Guizhou WP-13 turbojet engine, a copy of the Soviet Tumansky R-13; it is anticipated that an improved engine will be installed in production aircraft.

The operational WZ-7 has a significantly modified shape. The single vertical tail on the prototype was changed to a pair of canted tails. A turbofan engine was installed on the production model. Due to the different engine and aerodynamics, the endurance of the production model is unknown. It is speculated to be longer than the 10 hours advertised for the prototype.

Operational history
The WZ-7 entered service with the People's Liberation Army Air Force in 2018 and were spotted deployed to the Tibet Autonomous Region, Hainan Island and Yishuntun Airbase near North Korea.

On 24 July 2019, a WZ-7 shadowed the American   which was transiting the Taiwan Strait.

On 1 January 2023, a WZ-7 flew through the Miyako Strait into the Philippine Sea and returned to the East China Sea through the same route.

Operators

People's Liberation Army Air Force: 8 units
People's Liberation Army Naval Air Force: 8 units

Specifications

See also

References

Soar Dragon
Proposed aircraft of China
Single-engined jet aircraft
Tandem-wing aircraft
Unmanned military aircraft of China
High-altitude and long endurance aircraft